The Daytime Emmy Award for Outstanding Lead Actress in a Drama Series is an award presented annually by the National Academy of Television Arts and Sciences (NATAS) and Academy of Television Arts & Sciences (ATAS). It is given to honor an actress who has delivered an outstanding performance in a leading role while working within the daytime drama industry.

The 1st Daytime Emmy Awards ceremony was held in 1974, with Elizabeth Hubbard receiving the award for her role as Althea Davis on The Doctors. The award has undergone several name changes, originally honoring actresses in leading and supporting roles. Following the introduction of a new category in 1979, Outstanding Supporting Actress in a Drama Series, the award's name was altered to Outstanding Actress in a Drama Series, before changing once again, to its current title, years later. The awards ceremony was not aired on television in 1983 and 1984, having been criticized for voting integrity. In 1985, another category was introduced: Outstanding Younger Actress in a Drama Series; one criterion for this category was altered, requiring all actresses to be aged 26 or above. 

Since its inception, the award has been given to 28 actresses. One Life to Live is the show with the most awarded actresses, with a total of eleven. In 1995, Erika Slezak became the actress with the most wins in the category, when she won a fourth time, surpassing Helen Gallagher's previous record of three. Slezak went on to win in two additional years, ultimately receiving six wins. Susan Flannery and Kim Zimmer have since received four wins each. Susan Lucci has been nominated on 21 occasions, more than any other actress.

As of the 2022 ceremony, Mishael Morgan is the most recent winner in this category, for her portrayal of Amanda Sinclair on The Young and the Restless. She made Daytime Emmy history with the win, becoming the first-ever black actress to have garnered the award and the second black woman to have been nominated in this category, after Debbi Morgan became the first with her nomination in 2009.

Winners and nominees

1970s

1980s

1990s

2000s

2010s

2020s

Multiple wins and nominations

The following individuals received two or more wins in this category:

The following individuals received two or more nominations in this category:

Series with most awards

References

External links
 

Awards established in 1974
1974 establishments in the United States
Daytime Emmy Awards
Emmy